Tracewell House, also known as "Maple Shadows" and Tracewell Manor, is a historic home located near Parkersburg, Wood County, West Virginia. It was built about 1835, and is a two-story, single pile, painted brick I house in the Greek Revival style.  It has a slate covered gable roof and a two-story rear ell.

It was listed on the National Register of Historic Places in 1991.

References

Houses in Parkersburg, West Virginia
Houses on the National Register of Historic Places in West Virginia
Greek Revival houses in West Virginia
Houses completed in 1835
National Register of Historic Places in Wood County, West Virginia
I-houses in West Virginia